There were elections in 1999 to the United States House of Representatives:

Summary 

Elections are listed by date and district.

|-
| 
| colspan=3 | Vacant 
|  | Newt Gingrich (R) had resigned at the end of the previous Congress.New member elected February 23, 1999.Republican hold.
| nowrap | 

|-
| 
| Bob Livingston
|  | Republican
| 1977 
|  | Incumbent resigned March 1, 1999.New member elected May 29, 1999.Republican hold.
| nowrap | 

|-
| 
| George Brown Jr.
|  | Democratic
| 1972
|  | Incumbent died July 15, 1999.New member elected  November 16, 1999. Democratic hold.
| nowrap | 

|}

References 

 
1999